Carlos Walker Martínez (born in Vallenar on 2 February 1842; died in Santiago, Chile, on 5 October 1905) was a Chilean lawyer, politician and poet.

Biography

In September 1865, he was studying law at the University of Chile, when war with Spain began, and he enlisted in the navy, participating in the engagement of Abtao, 7 February 1866. In the same year he founded the literary magazine La República Literaria, at the head of which he remained while he was in Chili. He was appointed in 1867 secretary of the legation in Bolivia, was graduated in law in 1868, and traveled through Europe and the United States.

On his return to Chile in 1870, Walker Martínez was elected to congress for the department of Vallenar, and became secretary of the chamber of deputies. He was well known as a parliamentary orator. In 1873 he was appointed chargé d'affaires of Chile in Bolivia, and in 1874 he became minister in the same republic. During the War of the Pacific (1879-1883) he was president of the “Sociedad Protectora” (Protective Society) and in 1880-82 he was an editor of the journal El Nuevo Ferrocarril. During the cholera epidemic of 1886-87 he was founder and president of the Red Cross society.

Works
 Páginas de viaje (Santiago, 1871)
 Poesías líricas (3 vols., 1872)
 Romances Americanos (2 vols., 1874)
 Manuel Rodriguez, a historic drama in verse (1874)
 El Proscripto (1875)
 Diego Portales (1877)

Notes

References

1842 births
1905 deaths
People from Vallenar
Chilean people of English descent
Conservative Party (Chile) politicians
Deputies of the XVI Legislative Period of the National Congress of Chile
Deputies of the XVII Legislative Period of the National Congress of Chile
Deputies of the XIX Legislative Period of the National Congress of Chile
Deputies of the XX Legislative Period of the National Congress of Chile
Deputies of the XXI Legislative Period of the National Congress of Chile
Deputies of the XXII Legislative Period of the National Congress of Chile
Deputies of the XXIII Legislative Period of the National Congress of Chile
Senators of the XXIV Legislative Period of the National Congress of Chile
Senators of the XXV Legislative Period of the National Congress of Chile
Senators of the XXVI Legislative Period of the National Congress of Chile
Senators of the XXVII Legislative Period of the National Congress of Chile
Chilean male poets
19th-century Chilean poets
19th-century male writers
19th-century Chilean lawyers
University of Chile alumni
People of the Chilean Civil War of 1891